Eparchy of Mileševa is the one of eparchies of the Serbian Orthodox Church, and is seated in Prijepolje, in the Mileševa monastery.

History

The establishment of the Eparchy 
Eparchy is based in the valley Lim (river) and laid on the foundation of the Mileševa monastery, established in the first half of the 13th century. Eparchy has often changed the name, but he always had a seat in the Mileševa monastery. On the Establishment Mileševo Metropolia very little is known. In a service Saint Sava it is called "Glorious Archbishopric". One Metropolitan Bishop of Mileseva, whose name is unknown, crowned ban Tvrtko I of Bosnia as Serbian king and Bosnian King in 1377. The first Metropolitan Bishop of Mileseva whose name is known to us, is David. He was a "close associate to HercegStjepan Vukčić Kosača and his sons. " When Herceg Stjepan Vukčić Kosača drawing up a will, Metropolitan Bishop of Mileseva David, wrote and was a witness during the signing of the same.

After the Metropolitan David (Metropolitan of Mileseva), and probably under the influence of connection Metropolitanate with the space and the rulers of Hercegovina, hierarchs of Mileseva assume the title of Metropolitan Herzegovina and Milesevo. During the next three centuries Metropolitan and the Eparchy dwells in the Mileševa monastery.

Restoration of Mileševa Eparchy 
The first impetus for the establishment of the Eparchy, was to extend the title Bishop of Budimlja Bishop of Budimlje-Polimski. This happened after World War II, and it lasted only a decade. Finally, the Eparchy of Mileševa the western part of the Raška (region), Middle Polimlje and Potarje formed the 1992. year, and since then its center, of the Monastery Mileseva, standing Bishops Georgije Đokić, Vasilije Veinović and Filaret Mićević. Since 2017, the Bishop of  eparchy is Atanasije Rakita.

Monasteries

Monasteries in Serbia 

 Mileševa, seat
 Banja
 Davidovica
 Kumanica
 Dubnica
 Janja
 Bistrica
 Mažići
 Seljani

Monasteries in Montenegro 
 Holy Trinity
 Dovolja
 Đurđevića Tara
 Dubočica

Bishops of Mileševa 
 Georgije (Đokić) (1992-1994, administrator)
 Vasilije (Veinović) (1994-1997)
 Filaret (Mićević) (1999-2015)
 Joanikije (Mićović) (2015-2017, administrator)
 Atanasije (Rakita) (since 2017)

See also 
 List of Eparchies of the Serbian Orthodox Church

References

Sources 
 
 Mileševska eparhija danas („Pravoslavlje“, br. 909, 1. februar 2005.)

Serbian Orthodox Church in Serbia
Serbian Orthodox Church in Montenegro
Religious sees of the Serbian Orthodox Church
History of the Serbian Orthodox Church
1208 establishments in Europe
Religious organizations established in the 1200s
Dioceses established in the 13th century
Saint Sava